"Show Me the Way" is a song written by Dennis DeYoung and released as the second single from Edge of the Century by Styx. It peaked at #3 on the pop singles chart in March 1991. It is, to date, Styx's eighth and last top 10 Billboard single.

Lead vocalist/keyboardist Dennis DeYoung, a devout Roman Catholic, originally wrote the song for his son Matthew as a pseudo-hymn about the struggle to keep the faith in a "world so filled with hatred". Released in November 1990, the song was slowly scaling the charts. In January 1991, just prior to the United States' entry into the Gulf War, Music Director Chris Taylor from WAVA-FM in Washington, D.C. and Knoxville DJ Ray Edwards from WOKI-FM each did their own customized "Desert Shield Mix" incorporating television and call-in comments from officials, soldiers and callers as well as C-SPAN's coverage of the House and Senate debates.

Although released in the early 1990s, the song is very reminiscent of the classic Styx power ballad. Written in 6/8 time, the song begins quietly with the lone DeYoung on vocals and transitions into a big sounding vocal triad chorus. The bridge uses a solo DeYoung vocal praying and pleading that "if I see a light, should I believe? Tell me, how will I know?" followed by, on the album version, an acoustic guitar leading into an electric guitar solo. (On the single version, the acoustic guitar solo is eliminated.)

The single rose up the Billboard Hot 100 reaching #3 the week of March 16, 1991, and remained in the top 40 for 23 weeks. The song also hit No. 3 on the Adult Contemporary chart, remaining in the top 40 of that chart for 31 weeks. It also peaked at No. 4 on the Canadian pop charts.  While that association undoubtedly buoyed the song's success and contributed to its lingering appeal, the single had not yet peaked when the war officially ended on February 28, 1991.

The song was Styx's fourth and final top 5 single to date (and 8th top 10 single), and comes in at No. 68 on the Billboard rankings of the top Hot 100 singles of 1991. The song also placed Styx among a handful of artists to have top 10 singles in three different decades, the 1970s ("Lady," "Come Sail Away", "Babe"), the 1980s ("The Best of Times," "Too Much Time on My Hands," "Mr. Roboto," "Don't Let It End"), and the 1990s ("Show Me the Way").

Despite the song's enormous success along with "Babe", "Don't Let it End" and "The Best of Times", it has not been performed live by the band since singer Dennis DeYoung was dismissed in 1999. DeYoung, however, still performs the song regularly on his solo tours.

The music video for this song was directed by Michael Bay.

Charts

Weekly charts

Year-end charts

Personnel
Dennis DeYoung - lead vocals, keyboards, Roland D-50
James Young - lead guitar, backing vocals
Glen Burtnik - rhythm guitar, backing vocals
Chuck Panozzo  - bass 
John Panozzo - drums

References

1990s ballads
1990 songs
1990 singles
Styx (band) songs
Rock ballads
Songs written by Dennis DeYoung
Gulf War in popular culture
A&M Records singles
Music videos directed by Michael Bay